NMRI may refer to:

 Nuclear magnetic resonance imaging
 Naval Medical Research Institute, now part of the U.S. Navy's National Naval Medical Center